Ziller is a surname. Notable people with the surname include:

Ernst Ziller (1837–1923), Saxon architect
Eugene Ziller, American author
Hans Ziller (born 1958), German musician

See also
Miller (surname)
Zillmer
Zillner